Helegiu is a commune in Bacău County, Western Moldavia, Romania. It is composed of four villages: Brătila, Deleni, Drăgugești and Helegiu.
 
The commune was founded by merging the two neighbouring communes of Helegiu and Brătila as a result of the last administrative-territorial reorganization in 1968.

References

External links
Helegiu commune's official website (only Romanian)

Communes in Bacău County
Localities in Western Moldavia